Lester King may refer to:
Lester King (cricketer) (1939–1998), Jamaican cricketer
Lester Charles King (1907–1989), English geologist

See also
Jack Lester King